Selene is a genus of carangids, commonly known as lookdowns and moonfishes, native to the Atlantic Ocean and the eastern Pacific Ocean.

Species
There are currently eight recognized species in this genus:

References

 
Caranginae
Taxa named by Bernard Germain de Lacépède
Marine fish genera